Rostselmash is a Russian agricultural equipment company, based in Rostov-on-Don. Founded in 1929, it primarily produces combine harvesters. The company income in 2005 was around 400 million dollars. The company name is a syllabic abbreviation of Rostovskiy zavod sel'skokhozyaystvennykh mashin, the Rostov factory for agricultural machines.

The company formerly sponsored the football club FC Rostov; during that time the club was named FC Rostselmash.

History

Rostselmash was founded in 1929 as a government contractor, producing a variety of products for state farms. In 1931, the first Stalinets harvesters were produced. The Stalinets-1 was awarded with the highest award (Grand Prix diploma) during the World Industrial Exhibition in Paris in 1937 and by 1940 fifty thousand units were assembled.

During Operation Barbarosa, Rostselmash dismantled its plant in Rostov-on-Don, and relocated in Tashkent, the capital of Uzbekistan.  Production shifted from agricultural goods to military equipment until the end of the war. In 1943, production was returned to Rostov.

After the war, the Stalinets-6 harvesters were assembled and in 1955 Rostselmash began to specialize in grain harvester production.  In 1958, the SK-3 self-propelled harvesters were introduced followed by the SK-4 in 1962.  By 1969, Rostselmash produced a million harvesters. The SK Niva harvesters, introduced in 1973, remain in production for the Eastern European market.

By 1984 Rostselmash produced two million harvesters.  The Don Series combines were introduced in 1986; those along with tractors were sold in North America by Belarus Tractor of Canada.  Both had a reputation for poor quality, lack of operator comfort, poor reliability, and lack of part availability.

After the fall of the Soviet Union, Rostselmash was incorporated into a joint-stock company in 1992, and fully privatized in 2000. The new owners — Konstantin Babkin, Dmitry Udras and Yuri Ryazanov withdrew Rostselmash from the crisis of 1990-s.

In 2007 they took control of Buhler Industries of Winnipeg in Canada. Buhler Industries are the owners of the Canadian–built Versatile brand of articulated tractor, founded by Peter Pakosh.

Products

Harvesters
Rostselmash produces four harvester variants.  A 400 hp rotary harvester is sold the Rostselmash name in Eastern Europe and the Versatile name in North America.  The RT 490 uses a unique Rotating Concave Rotary design where the concave rotates counter to the rotor, reducing dead spots and increasing usable area.

Vector and Acros harvesters are sold in North America through Python Manufacturing Inc.

The Niva is a 155 hp harvester developed in the Soviet era, and is available only in Eastern Europe and Africa.

Tractors
Versatile tractors are available from 190 to 620 hp.

Grain Augers

Road-building machinery 
In September 2021, Rostselmash announced it would develop and manufacture road building machinery, with sales planned to begin in 2023. 70% of new production is intended to be localized by 2024. Construction of the new plant for road-building machinery also began in the same month.

References

Literature

External links

 

Companies based in Rostov-on-Don
Mechanical engineering companies of Russia
Russian brands
Companies formerly listed on the Moscow Exchange
Vehicle manufacturing companies established in 1929
Manufacturing companies of the Soviet Union
Agriculture companies of Russia